Infinity Land is the third studio album by Scottish rock band Biffy Clyro, released on 4 October 2004 on Beggars Banquet.

Overview
The album saw the band move into darker territory, in terms of both sound and lyrical content. It also furthered various experiments from The Vertigo of Bliss, such as using 5/4 time ("There is no Such Thing as a Jaggy Snake"), multiple time changes, key changes, instrumental variation, unpredictable riffs and complex song structures.

The album contains a hidden track, "Tradition Feed". After the final track, "Pause And Turn It Up", approximately 18 minutes of silence precedes a short poem, read by Simon Neil. "Tradition Feed" can also be found as a B-side to the vinyl 7" single "Only One Word Comes To Mind". As with each of the band's first three albums, it has been played in full once only, on 15 December 2005 at King Tut's Wah Wah Hut in Glasgow. "Only One Word Comes to Mind" reached #27 on the UK Singles Chart.

"Glitter And Trauma", "My Recovery Injection", and "Only One Word Comes To Mind" were released as singles in edited forms. "There's No Such Thing As A Jaggy Snake" was released as digital download. "Got Wrong" was considered for the final single but lost out to "Only One Word Comes To Mind".

The cover art was created by Chris Fleming, who also created the cover art for all the singles from Infinity Land.

Simon Neil has stated in various interviews that the title Infinity Land is a reference to serial killer Jeffrey Dahmer.

Track listing

Release history
Infinity Land was released in the UK in 2004.

References

External links
Official Biffy Clyro Website
'Dahmer' interview
Short article on Tradition Feed
Chris Fleming's Website

2004 albums
Biffy Clyro albums
Albums produced by Chris Sheldon
Beggars Banquet Records albums